Karl Oskar Georg Werner (8 April 1904 – 26 August 2002) was a Swedish freestyle swimmer who won bronze medals in the 4 × 200 m relay at the 1924 Olympics and 1926 European Championships.

References

1904 births
2002 deaths
Olympic swimmers of Sweden
Swimmers at the 1924 Summer Olympics
Olympic bronze medalists for Sweden
Olympic bronze medalists in swimming
Swedish male freestyle swimmers
European Aquatics Championships medalists in swimming
Medalists at the 1924 Summer Olympics
Swimmers from Stockholm